Majerník is a surname. Notable people with the surname include:

Cyprián Majerník (1909–1945), Slovak painter
Kamil Majerník (born 1943), Slovak footballer and manager
Pavol Majerník (born 1978), Slovak footballer
Peter Majerník (born 1978), Slovak footballer

Slovak-language surnames